Amantis reticulata is a species of praying mantis in the family Mantidae, found in Indomalaya.

References

reticulata
Mantodea of Southeast Asia
Insects of Indonesia
Insects of Malaysia
Invertebrates of Borneo
Fauna of Java
Fauna of Palawan
Fauna of Sulawesi
Fauna of Sumatra
Insects described in 1842